Abyss Odyssey is a platform action-adventure game developed by ACE Team and published by Atlus. It was released in July 2014 for the Xbox 360, PlayStation 3, and Microsoft Windows, and for the PlayStation 4 in July 2015.

The game's plot follows a set of heroes who fight to reach a warlock whose dreams are infecting reality in late 19th century Santiago, Chile. Abyss Odyssey combines elements from multiple video game genres, has a unique art style based on the Art Nouveau movement and has characters based on Chilean mythology. It received mostly positive reviews from critics who praised its atmosphere but criticized some aspects of gameplay.

Gameplay

The gameplay has a fusion of elements from a number of gaming genres. The player controls an avatar who battles enemies and advances through dungeons to reach the conclusion of the stage. The game's levels are procedurally generated, providing a new experience on each. The player only has one life but may be revived. If the player character dies, the player is put in control of a much weaker human who tries to avenge their death and can revive the player at specific altars.

The game's fighting system combines elements of the Super Smash Bros. and Street Fighter franchises, and rewards players for timing their blocks and attacks at the right moment. Players can capture the souls of enemies they encounter—once collected, a player can then assume the form and abilities of the enemy in-game. Abyss Odyssey uses a community-based unlock system; upon its launch, only the first "phase" of the game was available. After a certain number of players defeat the game's final boss, the Warlock, the next phase of the game is unlocked for all players.

Development

Developer ACE Team revealed Abyss Odyssey on their blog on 4 March 2014. The developers were inspired by the Art Nouveau movement and they used Harry Clarke as a direct reference for much of the game's art and atmosphere. The developers intended the game to be extremely replayable and designed the combat mechanics to be simple to understand, after initially considering a more complicated fighting layout.

An Enhanced Edition titled Abyss Odyssey: Extended Dream Edition introduced competitive multiplayer as well as new types of enemies and bosses to the game and was released for the PlayStation 4 in July 2015. A "nightmare" difficulty mode is included in the Enhanced Edition.

Reception

The game received "mixed or average reviews" on all platforms according to the review aggregation website Metacritic. Critics praised the game's art style and atmosphere, but were disappointed by some of its game mechanics and its repetitive nature.

Eurogamers Dan Whitehead praised the PC version's visuals and new ideas in a positive review, but felt that there was a "... sense that in straddling so many genres, the game has spread itself a little thin." IGNs Richard Cobbett compared the same PC version's roguelike elements unfavorably to The Binding of Isaac and Spelunky, but noted that "the soundtrack is fantastic, and the art is even better." Hardcore Gamers James Cunningham likened the art style to "playing a Grateful Dead album cover" and called it "a quirky little gaming gem."

Reception to the combat system was mixed. Destructoids Alasdair Duncan felt that the combat system was "enjoyable and deep" and provided one of the main reasons to play the game, while PC Gamers Emanuel Maiberg derided what he felt to be the game's sluggish control input and compared the game negatively to the Super Smash Bros. series that its fighting system is based on.

References

External links

 
 

2014 video games
ACE Team games
Action-adventure games
Atlus games
Multiplayer and single-player video games
PlayStation 3 games
PlayStation 4 games
PlayStation Network games
Roguelike video games
Sega games
Unreal Engine games
Video games developed in Chile
Video games featuring female protagonists
Video games set in Chile
Video games using procedural generation
Windows games
Xbox 360 Live Arcade games